The 1931 Jefferson Bobcats football team was an American football team that represented Jefferson University (formerly known as Jefferson Law School) during the 1931 college football season. In its second season of intercollegiate football, Jefferson compiled a 1–7–1 record. George C. Sutherland was the head coach and was succeeded by player-coach Frankie Estes. Chester ("Gump" or "Gabby") Weatherford was the team captain. The team played its home games at Oak Cliff Field in Dallas. Known as the Lawyers in 1930, the team was re-branded as the Bobcats for the 1931 season to go along with the Jefferson University re-branding.

Jefferson was opened in 1919 as a law school by Andrew J. Priest in downtown Dallas. One of its early faculty members was Judge Sarah T. Hughes. The school achieved some success training lawyers and had a high graduation rate and most students successfully passed the bar exam. Jefferson was rebranded as Jefferson University in 1931 as it added additional colleges such as engineering, liberal arts, business, commerce, and secretarial training.

Playing against mostly junior college and smaller four-year college teams, Jefferson was only able to score seven points on the entire season. Despite the lack of scoring, the Bobcats were competitive in their early games, losing two games by a single touchdown, tying one game at 0–0 and then finally winning when the other team missed an extra point for a 7–6 victory. Thereafter, the team was blown out, with an especially bad loss coming against a top all-boys preparatory school in Dallas, Terrill Prep School, losing by a 52–0 score.

Schedule

References

Jefferson Law School
Dixie Rebels football seasons
Jefferson Law School Lawyers football